The Miracles were the Motown Record Corporation's first group and its first million-selling recording artists. During their nineteen-year run on the American music charts, the Miracles charted over fifty hits and recorded in the genres of doo wop, soul, disco, and R&B. Twenty-six Miracles songs reached the top 10 of the Billboard R&B singles chart, including four R&B number ones. Sixteen charted within the top 20 of the Billboard Hot 100, with seven reaching the top ten and two – 1970's "The Tears of a Clown" and 1975's "Love Machine" (Part 1) – reaching #1. A third song, the million-selling "Shop Around", reached #1 on the Cash Box magazine pop chart. The Miracles also scored 11 U.S. R&B top 10 albums, including 2-#1's. 

According to several websites, the Miracles are one of the most covered groups in recorded history and the most covered Motown group ever. Their music and songs have influenced artists all over the world – in every major musical genre – over the last 50 years. At #32, the Miracles are the highest-ranking Motown group on Rolling Stone Magazine's list of "The 100 Greatest Artists of All Time". They also have the distinction of having more songs inducted into the Grammy Hall of Fame than any other Motown group. All releases were on Motown Records' Tamla subsidiary label unless otherwise indicated.

In the 1960s, Motown Record Corporation, like many independent labels, did not register sales figures through the RIAA, the organization that certifies and awards Gold Records. So it is difficult to determine the full number of Miracles songs and recordings that sold a million or more records. Also, with the passing of time, some songs that did not sell a million records initially may have indeed done so over the years. However, several reference works, such as the books Hits of the '60s: The Million Sellers by Demitri Coryton & Joseph Murrells, as well as The Book of Golden Discs by Joseph Murrells, point out that the Miracles had several million-selling records during their career, including "Shop Around" (1961), "You've Really Got a Hold on Me" (1962), "Mickey's Monkey" (1963), "The Tracks of My Tears" (1965), "Going To A Go-Go", (single and album) (1965), "I Second That Emotion" (1967), "Baby Baby Don't Cry" (1969), "The Tears of a Clown"* (1970), "Do It Baby" (1974), "Love Machine"* (1975), and the platinum album City of Angels (1975). This is quite probably an incomplete list, since Miracle Pete Moore stated on his corporate website, that the Miracles actually had 12 million-selling records to their credit by 1967, including 1965's "Ooo Baby Baby".

Albums

The Miracles
Tamla (Motown) releases

Smokey Robinson & the Miracles
Tamla (Motown) releases

The Miracles (with Billy Griffin)
Tamla (Motown) releases

Columbia releases

Compilations
Motown releases

Singles

The Miracles

First (pre-Motown) releases

Tamla (Motown) releases

Smokey Robinson & The Miracles
(Same members, name changed to spotlight lead singer)
Tamla (Motown) releases

The Miracles (with Billy Griffin)
Tamla (Motown) releases

Columbia releases (as "The Miracles featuring Billy Griffin")

Notes

Videography

DVD release
Smokey Robinson & The Miracles: The Definitive Performances (1963–1987) (2006)

References

External links
 Miracles member Pete Moore's corporate website - WBMM Enterprises (Miracles Facts)
 Asanovic, Bosko; Rimmer, Dave & Goldberg, Marv. Miracles discography. Soulful Kinda Music.
 The Miracles songs and albums- from the "Soully Oldies" website
 The Miracles: Bio and Discography
 The Miracles' Albums
 

Discographies of American artists
Soul music discographies
Discography